The city of Hyderabad, India has a number of Bazaars, as follows:

 Afzal Gunj
 Begum Bazaar
 Chatta Bazaar
 Jambagh flower market
 Laad Bazaar
 Madina, Hyderabad
 Moazzam Jahi Market
 Shahran Market
 Sultan Bazar
 Abids
 Shilparamam
 Pathargatti
 general bazaar

Bazaars in India
Bazaars in Hyderabad, India
Shopping districts and streets in India
Bazaars
Bazaars